Alexandre Farias de Lima Júnior or simply Xinho (born June 30, 1989), is a Brazilian defensive midfielder and left back. He has played for Sport, Cabense, Sousa, Belo Jardim and Central.

References

1989 births
Living people
Brazilian footballers
Sport Club do Recife players
Central Sport Club players
Association football defenders